Gustav GemmingenHornberg (7 December 1925 – 30 January 2005) was a German politician of the Free Democratic Party (FDP) and former member of the German Bundestag.

Life 
Gemmingen-Hornberg was a member of the German Bundestag from 11 October 1967, when he succeeded Hans Lenz, who had left the parliament, until 1969. He had entered parliament via the Baden-Württemberg state list. In the Bundestag he was deputy chairman of the Development Aid Committee.

Literature

References

1925 births
2005 deaths
Members of the Bundestag for Baden-Württemberg
Members of the Bundestag 1965–1969
Members of the Bundestag for the Free Democratic Party (Germany)